Cleveland Park Stadium was a greyhound racing and speedway stadium in Middlesbrough, North Yorkshire.  It was built in 1928 and demolished in 1996.

Origins

The idea of constructing a greyhound track in Middlesbrough came from Jack French who formed the National Greyhounds Middlesbrough Ltd. An eleven-acre site of former allotments in the Ayresome Ward, south of the River Tees and directly south of the Tees Marshalling Yard Railways and Stockton Road Tramway was chosen in 1928.

Opening
The first greyhound meeting was held on 19 May 1928 watched by an attendance of eight thousand. A greyhound called Just Alone won the first race over 500 yards with the meeting consisting of seven races including two hurdle races and two handicap races. Middlesbrough Speedway followed three months later on 23 August 1928.

Pre war history
The stadium facilities included two enclosures both featuring members clubs, one on the home straight and another slightly larger one on the back straight. Between the first and second bends was the hare control and between the third and fourth bends was the tote control which opened later in 1936. The stewards box and offices were situated on the home straight before the first bend.

A greyhound called Cheerful Chinaman won his first race on 20 August 1928 and went on to win 138 races from 452 outings when retiring on 21 November 1934. (A record believed to be still held today). The first track champion was a greyhound called Brilliant Gambler an Irish import that held the track records over 470 and 650 yards.

In 1938 all greyhounds were owned by the company after privately owned greyhounds were phased out, a move designed to foil doping. Distances changed to 288, 500, 518 and 700 yards.

Post war history
Totalisator turnover during 1946 equated to £656,386 and one year later a new Electro-Mechanical tote was installed.

In 1956 there was a triple dead heat between Law Maker, Red Bay and Spinach Lad in 30.36 over 518 yards, an excellent grading achievement by Racing Manager R W Burns. The feat was repeated three years later when Quarry Tanist, Sandboy & Skip Me crossed the line together on 12 July 1959. In 1961 the track hosted a heat of the BBC Television Trophy shown live on Sportsview.

Throughout the 1960s the raced on Wednesday and Saturday nights and the resident trainers were Harry Gendle and K Nelson. The principal event was the Cleveland Stayers Championship and amenities on offer to the public included four bars and three cafes.

Vic Abbott replaced R W Burns as Racing Manager and the decision was taken in 1967 to sand the bends replacing the grass. The entire track would be converted to sand in 1984. During 1978 Harry Gendle retired after 46 years as a trainer at the track.

The only major race win by a Middlesbrough greyhound came in 1982 when Irish Grand National champion Face The Mutt won the Scottish Grand National for trainer Reece before moving to Norah McEllistrim at Wimbledon Stadium the same year and completed the triple crown of by winning the English Grand National.

In 1985 a serious arson attack destroyed the main stand and Ross Searle took over from Vic Abbott. In 1987 the track hosted auctions for the first time but during 1990 the track suffered an exodus of trainers because a revamped Sunderland had opened.

Speedway

Closure
In September 1996 the site was sold and the track was demolished to make way for the Goals soccer centre football pitches and the Macmillan City Technology College extension (part of the Macmillan Academy)

Notable track records

Pre-Metric

Post-Metric

References

Defunct greyhound racing venues in the United Kingdom
Defunct speedway venues in England